The Guam Rugby Football Union (GRFU) is the governing body for rugby union in Guam. The union was formed in 1997 as a sports federation to help develop and host rugby when Guam was chosen to host the 1999 South Pacific Games. They were recognized as a member of the Guam National Olympic Committee in 1996. They were accepted as a full member by the International Rugby Board in 1998.

Teams 

 Guam national rugby union team
 Guam national rugby sevens team
 Guam women's national rugby union team
 Guam women's national rugby sevens team

See also 

 Rugby union in Guam

References

External links 

 Guam on World Rugby
 Guam on Asia Rugby

Rugby union in Guam
Guam
Sports in Guam by sport
Sports organizations established in 1997